Cayman Brac is an island that is part of the Cayman Islands. The island is named after this prominent feature, as "brac" is a Gaelic name for a bluff.

History

Christopher Columbus sighted Cayman Brac and its sister island, Little Cayman, on 10 May 1503 when his ship was blown off course during a trip between Hispaniola and Panama. He named them "Las Tortugas" because of the many turtles he spotted on the islands. The Cayman Islands were renamed by Sir Francis Drake, who came upon the islands during a voyage in 1586. He used the word "Caymanas", taken from the Carib name for crocodiles after seeing many of the large crocodilians. Many people believe he had only seen the rock iguanas that inhabit the island today.

During the heyday of piracy, pirates would use Cayman Brac as a haven and a place to replenish their supplies as there are a number of fresh water wells on the island and had many sources of food included in the local flora and fauna.

Attractions

Diving:

Of interest to scuba divers is a  Russian Koni class frigate built in the Soviet Union in 1984 for the Cuban Navy. It is one of only a few sunken Soviet naval vessels in the Western Hemisphere, and the only one that is easily dived. The Koni II class frigate was purchased and sunk by the Cayman Islands government in September 1996. Originally designated 356, the frigate was rechristened the M/V Captain Keith Tibbetts, after a well-known Cayman Brac politician. The wreck is the only Russian warship that divers can explore in the Western hemisphere. The result was that the fore section tipped to about a 45-degree angle in relation to the remainder of the still-upright aft portion. and the midships became a debris field. The wreck's stern area was essentially unaffected. There are numerous openings in the upper portion of the ship for non-wreck certified divers. Many more openings are available since the ship broke in half. The site also serves as an artificial reef. Other interesting dive sites are Radar Reef, Cemetery Wall, and the Wilderness Wall, all well covered in corals and with a wide diversity of marine life.

Caves:
Cayman Brac also appeals to visitors of many persuasions besides divers. Caves are found around the island, offering spelunkers a glimpse of delicate underground formations. Steps and, in some cases, ladders have been constructed to allow visitor access to more remote caves. One cave, Rebecca's Cave, contains the grave of a young girl lost in a struggle against the ravages of the great 1932 Cuba hurricane, and it is a Cayman National Heritage Site.

Rock climbing:
Rock climbing was developed beginning in 1992 and the island now contains about 100 sport climbs. Trad and multipitch climbs are rare.

Walking and hiking trails:
Walking and hiking trails have been opened by the Nature Tourism Programme which allow exploration of the island's densely forested karst landscapes. Unique flora and fauna thrive here and can be observed in the wild.

Fishing:
Cayman Brac's waters are utilized for both recreational fishing and the pursuit of big game fish.

Politics

The politics of Cayman Brac are dominated by the liberal People’s Progressive Movement, who won every electoral district in both the Brac and Little Cayman.

Local economy

The local economy tends to be concentrated in three areas which are probably typical for many Caribbean locales: tourism, municipal government, and local enterprises. Although on the Brac, the government (including Cayman Airways, the national carrier) is the largest employer. Some of the more economically prominent families in Grand Cayman originate from Cayman Brac, namely the Kirkconnells, Fosters, Waltons, and Scotts. The majority of the tourism sector is concentrated on scuba diving, although this is in recent decline in the hospitality sector, with one of the two local hotels, Divi Resorts, having closed operations in 2006. The island's economy was also adversely affected by significant damage from Category 4 Hurricane Paloma in November 2008.

A local enterprise that is nearly unique to Cayman Brac is its artists who work in a local stone known as caymanite, typically making jewellery or small stone carvings. Two of these artists have been Eddie Scott and Tenson Scott, whose works have won national contests, as well as being the official gift to Queen Elizabeth II and Prince Philip during the 1994 state visit.  For the 2011 wedding of Prince William, the official Cayman Islands gift was crafted by Horacio Esteban, who grew up on Cayman Brac and is currently living on Grand Cayman.

Current airline service

Charles Kirkconnell International Airport (formerly known as Gerrard Smith International Airport) serves the island.  All scheduled passenger flights are operated by Cayman Airways and subsidiary Cayman Airways Express with service to and from Grand Cayman being flown with Saab 340B regional turboprops and also small Twin Otter turboprop aircraft with limited flights also being operated on this interisland route with Boeing 737 MAX jetliners.  In addition, Cayman Airways provides limited seasonal 737 jet service between Cayman Brac and Miami either nonstop or via one stop in Grand Cayman and also operates weekly nonstop 737 service to Miami.

Historical airline service

In 1965, Cayman Brac Airways (CBA), a subsidiary of LACSA Airlines, was operating twice weekly round trip service flown with a Beech Model 18 twin prop aircraft on a routing of Grand Cayman - Little Cayman - Cayman Brac - Montego Bay. According to the airline's 1 May 1965, timetable, connecting service to Miami via Grand Cayman was offered by LACSA, an airline based in Costa Rica, while additional connecting service to Miami as well as to New York City was offered by Pan Am via Montego Bay.  In 1968, the government of the Cayman Islands purchased a controlling interest in Cayman Brac Airways from LACSA and then formed Cayman Airways which has served the airport since that time.

Education

The Cayman Islands Education Department operates two primary schools and one secondary school on the island. These include:

Creek & Spot Bay Primary School (Infant school and Junior School)
West End Primary School
Layman E. Scott Sr. High School

References

External links

 Cayman Brac's website
 Cayman Islands Tourism Official, Cayman Brac
 2005 Photo of the Teignmouth Electron on Cayman Brac
 2005 Photo of the Teignmouth Electron on Cayman Brac
 The Teignmouth Electron is at coordinates 

 
Islands of the Cayman Islands
Ports and harbours of the Cayman Islands